Charles Mingus and Friends in Concert is a live album by the jazz bassist and composer Charles Mingus, recorded at the Philharmonic Hall of the Lincoln Center for the Performing Arts in 1972 and released on the Columbia label. The CD release added five previously unreleased performances from the concert, but did not include the opening track, Fats Waller's "Honeysuckle Rose", present in the LP version and on former Japanese CD editions.

Critical reception
The AllMusic review by Scott Yanow stated that "most of the music is overly loose but the overcrowded 'E's Flat, Ah's Flat Too' and particularly the 'Little Royal Suite' are memorable."

Track listing
All compositions by Charles Mingus, except as indicated

 Introduction – 1:06 Bonus track on CD 
 "Jump Monk" – Mingus 7:27 
 "E.S.P." – 9:24 
 "Ecclusiastics" – 9:31 
 "Eclipse" – 4:02 
 "Us Is Two" – 10:12 
 "Taurus in the Arena of Life" – 4:53 Bonus track on CD
 "Mingus Blues" – 5:32 
 Introduction to Little Royal Suite – 0:13 
 "Little Royal Suite" – 20:20 
 Introduction to Strollin' – 0:50 Bonus track on CD 
 "Strollin'" (Honi Gordon, Mingus) – 10:13 Bonus track on CD 
 "The I of Hurricane Sue" – 11:11 Bonus track on CD 
 "E's Flat, Ah's Flat Too" – 17:07 
 "Ool-Ya-Koo" (Curtis Fuller, Dizzy Gillespie) – 3:53 
 "Portrait" – 3:58 Bonus track on CD 
 "Don't Be Afraid, the Clown's Afraid Too" – 10:36 Bonus track on CD

Personnel
Charles Mingus – bass, arranger
James Moody – flute
Jon Faddis, Lonnie Hillyer, Lloyd Michaels, Eddie Preston – trumpet
Richard Berg, Sharon Moe – French horn
Eddie Bert – bass trombone
Robert Stewart – tuba
Howard Johnson – tuba, bass saxophone
Lee Konitz, Charles McPherson, Rich Perry – alto saxophone
Gene Ammons, George Dorsey – tenor saxophone
Bobby Jones – tenor saxophone, clarinet
Gerry Mulligan – baritone saxophone
John Foster, Randy Weston – piano
Milt Hinton – bass
Joe Chambers – drums
Dizzy Gillespie, Honi Gordon – vocals
Bill Cosby – Master of Ceremonies
Sy Johnson – arranger
Teo Macero – arranger conductor

References

Charles Mingus live albums
1972 live albums
Columbia Records live albums
Albums produced by Teo Macero
Albums recorded at the Lincoln Center for the Performing Arts